Parafrasura is a monotypic moth genus in the subfamily Arctiinae described by Antonio Durante in 2012. Its only species, Parafrasura pectinella, was first described by Embrik Strand in 1922. It is known from Angola, Chad, the Democratic Republic of the Congo and Cameroon.

References

Nudariina
Moths of Africa
Moths described in 1922
Monotypic moth genera